The fourth season of Black-ish aired from October 3, 2017, to May 15, 2018, on ABC in the United States. It is produced by Khalabo Ink Society, Cinema Gypsy Productions, Principato-Young Entertainment and ABC Studios, with creator Kenya Barris, who also serves as executive producer alongside Anthony Anderson, Brian Dobbins, Jonathan Groff and Helen Sugland.

The series revolves around Dre, portrayed by Anthony Anderson, a family man who struggles with finding his cultural identity while raising his kids in a white neighborhood. He lives with his wife, Bow (Tracee Ellis Ross).

From this season forward, Yara Shahidi is a recurring character, due to her character receiving her own spin-off show, Grown-ish.


Cast

Main cast
 Anthony Anderson as Dre Johnson
 Tracee Ellis Ross as Bow Johnson
 Marcus Scribner as Andre ("Junior") Johnson Jr.
 Miles Brown as Jack Johnson
 Marsai Martin as Diane Johnson
 Peter Mackenzie as Leslie Stevens
 Deon Cole as Charlie Telphy
 Jenifer Lewis as Ruby Johnson

Recurring cast
 Laurence Fishburne as Earl "Pops" Johnson
 Yara Shahidi as Zoey Johnson
 Jeff Meacham as Josh Oppenhol
 Nicole Sullivan as Janine
 Wanda Sykes as Daphne Lido
 Nelson Franklin as Connor Stevens
 Allen Maldonado as Curtis
 Catherine Reitman as Lucy
 Jennie Pierson as Ms. Davis
 Emerson Min as Mason

Guest cast
 Aloe Blacc as himself
 Fonzworth Bentley as himself
 Trevor Jackson as Aaron
 Annelise Grace as Megan
 Anna Deavere Smith as Alicia
 Rick Fox as himself
 Paul F. Tompkins as Dr. Reagan
 Andrew Daly as Dr. Evan Windsor
 Rashida Jones as Santamonica
 Raven-Symoné as Rhonda Johnson
 Brittany Daniel as Blair
 Amy Hill as Nana Jean
 Amanda Seales as Barbara
 Cedric the Entertainer as Smokey
 Beau Bridges as Paul
 Marla Gibbs as Mabel
 Leslie Grossman as Gwen
 Rob Huebel as Gary
 Ted Allen as himself
 Daveed Diggs as Johan
 Dana Powell as Marla
 Suzy Nakamura as Dr. Ima

Episodes

Unaired episode
The would-be fourteenth episode of the season, titled "Please, Baby, Please", was shot in November 2017, and originally scheduled to air on February 27, 2018. However on February 22, 2018, ABC announced that the episode would be pulled from the schedule and that a repeat of a past episode would air instead. USA Today stated that the episode "was apparently too political for the network". An ABC spokesperson said that there "were creative differences we were unable to resolve". On March 10, 2018, it was officially announced that the network had no plans to air the episode. In the episode, Dre tries to read a bedtime story to Devante during a thunderstorm, but instead improvises a new story based on recent social and political issues in the United States. It was added to Hulu on August 10, 2020.

Reception

Ratings

References

2017 American television seasons
2018 American television seasons
Black-ish